Hentges is a surname. Notable people with the surname include:

Eric Hentges (born 1952), American executive director of the International Life Sciences Institute
François Hentges (1885– 1968), Luxembourgian gymnast
Hale Hentges (born 1996), American football tight end
Pierre Hentges (1890–1975), Luxembourgish gymnast
Roby Hentges (born 1940), Luxembourgian cyclist
Sam Hentges (born 1996), American baseball pitcher